Emita Arosemena Zubieta (born c. 1931 in Las Tablas, Panamá) was a Panamanian beauty pageant contestant winner of the Miss Panamá 1953 title. Also represented Panama in Miss Universe 1953, the 2nd Miss Universe was held on July 17, 1953 at Long Beach Municipal Auditorium, Long Beach, California, United States. She placed in the top 16 (12) semifinalist.

She represented Los Santos state.

Arosemena died in Uruguay where she resided.

References

External links
 Miss Panamá  official website

1930s births
Miss Universe 1953 contestants
Panamanian beauty pageant winners
Panamanian emigrants to Uruguay
People from Las Tablas, Los Santos
Señorita Panamá
Year of death missing